Ed Kissell is a former professional American football player who played defensive back for four seasons for the Pittsburgh Steelers

References

1929 births
American football safeties
Wake Forest Demon Deacons football players
Pittsburgh Steelers players
Living people